Road Ratt was a Swedish rockband in the vein of Kiss, Van Halen, Aerosmith etc.

Formation

Early years

The band formed in Gothenburg as Icewind in 1988 by members Christer Örtefors (vocals/guitar), Alban Herlitz (lead guitar), Casper Janebrink (bass) and Tommy Carlsson (drums). All the money earned from gigs went into a recording of their first demo. Produced by John Ballard in TUFF Studios, the tape gained some recognition locally but record companies were not yet willing to sign them to a serious contract. In 1990 Casper and Tommy, encouraged by their musician-fathers, abandoned ship to form what was to become the famous danceband Arvingarna.

Becoming Road Ratt

The name Icewind briefly changed to Hot n'Spicy before a British biker gang inspired the permanent change to Road Ratt. They added the extra "t" in Ratt to have equal number of letters in both words for the logo to look balanced.

Road to stardom

With Ola Johansson (bass) and Patrik Herrström (drums) as replacements the band participated in an international band contest called Band Explotion. Out of 800 Scandinavian contenders they reached top 4, and the local press started to take notice. Determined not to be a talent show phenomenon the band now focused on their live act and on writing new material for a second demo. Alban Herlitz however sneaked one more tape away to Rockslaget, a local competition arranged by ABF and Göteborgs-Posten.

As it was a local thing the band decided it was a good opportunity to test the new material, and agreed to participate.

As 138 bands were reduced to 20 during the course of the competition, Road Ratt started to look like clear favourites. To further enhance the show Christer Örtefors decided to lose the guitar and concentrate on the singing. Fredrik Stenberg, Patrik Herrström's childhood friend, was called in, and the band became a 5-piece in time for the semi-finals.

Together with eight other bands they reached the finals and went into the studio to record two songs for the album that showcased the finalists. The songs were Money and Bad Girls, and the studio was once again TUFF Studios.

The finals took place at Liseberg's main stage, and the audience was estimated to be about 14.000. Being huge favorites, and with a large crowd of fans up front, they were declared winners at the end of the evening.

Record deal

The prize for winning was the recording of a single but the band instead took the money and cut a 6-song demo with producer Pär Edwardson with ambition to shop around for a deal. But because of the media attention offers already came pouring in from various record companies and the evening tabloids speculated in what label would finally get their signatures. The band brought their new producer and settled with MNW - at the time home to Imperiet, Peter LeMarc, Wannadies, Nationalteatern, Thomas Di Leva, Wilmer X etc.

The album

Recording sessions started at Decibel Studios in Stockholm in the fall of -91 and continued at Sveriges Radio (Gothenburg) in the spring of -92. 11 songs made it to the final mix that was done at Mistlur Studios by Stefan Glauman (later producing for Rammstein, Bon Jovi, Def Leppard etc.). The songs were:

 1. Ragman City
 2. Use The Lighter
 3. Resurrection
 4. Itsypooked
 5. Mr Preacher
 6. C'mon And Do Me
 7. Beggar's Day
 8. Funny People
 9. I Wish
 10. Shake It Up
 11. Turn Me On

The album was released October 14 -92 and the Swedish state television SVT broadcast a 30min. TV special from the release party. Sponsored by Pizza Hut and held at the club Gamle Port a record number of 900-1000 guests attended. A Gamle Port-all-time high that stands to this day.

The singles

Two singles were released from the album:

RESURRECTION
 1. Resurrection
 2. I Wish
 3. Use The Lighter

ITSYPOOKED
 1. Itsypooked
 2. Funny People
 3. Itsypooked (Acoustic Version)

The videos

Because the work on the album took so long two videos were made from the previous demos to keep the interest up. Both directed by Patric Ullaeus. The first one was Rag Man City. That video won national first prize for best new director. The second one was Shake It Up, shot at a live performance in the club White Corner.
When the album was released MNW again turned to Patric Ullaeus to direct a video for the Bon Joviesque ballad Itsypooked.

TV appearances and radio broadcasts

Except for the 30min TV-special from the release party Road Ratt appeared as guests in music programs on SVT1, SVT2, TV3, ZTV, Kanal 5 and MTV. They also hosted a short lived 1 hour radio show on Swedish Radio P3 called unplugged where they played acoustic for half an hour followed by phone calls from the fans and DJing their own favorite songs. Others sharing that honor were Roxette and Lisa Nilsson.

Awards and nominations

1992 Road Ratt were nominated for a Swedish Grammy in the category Best hardrock along with Electric Boys, Candlemass and Sator losing out to Sator. The televised gala was one for the historybooks as it was the last time alcohol was served to the artists during broadcasting. A scandal erupted as Popsicle received their prize for Best rockband wishing death-by-tour-bus-accident onto Arvingarna, the danceband once sprung from Road Ratt who collected their prize for Best danceband that evening.

1993 Nominated for Best newcomer and Best Album at Swedish Zeppelin-awards. Losing out to Clawfinger in both cases. Road Ratt However performed live at the event broadcast by MTVs Headbangers Ball. The Headbangers Ball-episode hosted by Vanessa Warwick featured a lengthy interview with the band and the international premiere for the Itsypooked video.

Rise and fall

Immediately after the album-release Alban Herlitz left the band as his songwriting contributions were rejected by the rest of the band. He went on to create the pop-trio Together and renewed his collaboration with John Ballard who at the time had tremendous success with his work on Swedish sensation Ace of Base. Together later wrote the theme for the Swedish soap-opera Vita lögner. The song Bara Vi Är Vänner reached the top of the charts. Alban was replaced by Håkan Svensson who at the same time toured with Louise Hoffsten on her Rhythm & Blonde-tour.
Road Ratt toured all over Sweden but failed to climb the charts and record sales did not live up to the hause and critic acclaim that surrounded the band. The single most memorable moment of the tour occurred August 8, 1993. Road Ratt was playing in front of about 25.000 people at Stockholm Water Festival. Headlining together with Louise Hoffsten (Håkan had a busy day), Sven Ingvars and Carola Häggkvist (with Pär Edwardson on guitar) when the new Swedish fighter aircraft JAS 39 Gripen came crashing down during a display. Despite the large crowd attending the festival no one was hurt.
After the tour work began on a second album but the grunge scene was taking over and the bandmembers started on side projects resulting in lack of commitment. The album with the working title Young Nurses In Love never made the finish line, and the saga was over.

Leftovers

In 2007 a Myspace-site was launched in memory of the band. Before long various record companies contacted the site and a deal was made with Australian-based Suncity Records to release the demos for the previously unreleased "Young Nurses In Love". With the new name "You Love Us" the CD was released in December 2008.
In 2021 "Going To Eden" and "Man On The Moon" were released on Spotify and other digital platforms.

What the band members are doing today

 Christer Örtefors now plays the bass in Freak Kitchen where he is known as Capman. He also runs a side project called Eaglestrike.
 Patrik Herrström runs various clubs in Gothenburg like Playground and Slippery People. He also plays drums with Timo Räisänen as well as being a member of the rockgroup C.Armée. Patrik was previously a member of Her Majesty and Transport League.
 Fredrik Stenberg is head of the guitar department at Yamaha Scandinavia and plays the guitar with God's Favorite. He also work on Swedish commercial radio - Bandit Rock.
 Ola left the music scene and to become a renowned fashion/commercial photographer. He also directed music videos and commercials for TV. He was a recurring guest in various radio-panels at Mix Megapol. Now he resides in the southern parts of Sweden and puts out music under the name Skeleton Crew.
 Alban Herliz has made a name for himself as a producer/songwriter as well as for managing pop acts like Bubbles.
 Håkan Svensson is now playing with Nationalteatern and Stefan Andersson. He also runs a recording studio together with the old Road Ratt-producer Pär Edwardson. The most well known records to come out of there are the ones released by Björn Rosenström.

External links
 Road Ratt's homepage

Swedish rock music groups